Shotgun is the third album by Tony Lucca and it was released on March 30, 2004.

Album information
Tony Lucca released two albums prior to Shotgun, independently and both were met with moderate success. The album was Lucca's first commercially distributed full-length studio album. Lucca wrote and composed most of the songs by himself, but co-wrote a few with friends such as Matt Morris and Robb Boldt.

Track listing
"Shotgun (Can't You See)" (Tony Lucca) – 4:44
"Catch Me" (Tony Lucca) – 3:52
"Someone To Love You" (B. Goldin, Alejandro Abad, Tony Lucca) – 4:07
"Bad Guy" (Tony Lucca) – 5:15
"Maiden" (Cole Garlak, Tony Lucca) – 5:20
"She's True" (Matt Morris, Tony Lucca) – 4:40
"Roller Coaster" (Robb Boldt, Alejandro Abad, Tony Lucca) – 3:22
"Happily Ever After" (Tony Lucca) – 4:08
"Los Angeleno" (Tony Lucca) – 4:19
"By A Thread" (Tony Lucca) – 5:03
"Attach The Hitch" (Martin Flores, Cees van der Linden, Alejandro Abad, Tony Lucca) – 0:36
"Broken Wagon" (Tony Lucca) – 4:32
"Welcome To The Bay / Put Your Seat Back" (Tony Lucca, Cees van der Linden) – 7:21

Personnel 
Andy Abad – electric guitar
JC Chasez – executive producer
Martin Flores – percussion, drums
Mando Gonzales – assistant
Cees van der Linden – bass, programming, producer
Tony Lucca – electric guitar, piano, vocals, producer, executive producer
Michael Williams – executive producer

2004 albums
Tony Lucca albums